The Green Party of Aotearoa New Zealand female co-leadership election, 2018 is an election that took place between 26 March and 7 April 2018 to determine the future leadership of the Green Party of Aotearoa New Zealand.

Background 
On 9 August 2017, Metiria Turei announced she had stood down as co-leader of the Green Party following media scrutiny of her public admission to committing benefit fraud in the early 1990s, stating that the "scrutiny on [her] family has become unbearable." This triggered an election to fill the now vacant female co-leadership, which the party had previously stated would be conducted at the 2018 party annual general meeting. It had been possible that a Special General Meeting or postal ballot may have been used to elect a new co-leader earlier.

On 26 January 2018, James Shaw announced the election timeline to determine the next female co-leader, with the ballots to be counted and a winner to be announced on 8 April 2018. Following the election, Marama Davidson was elected the new female co-leader of the Green Party.

Key dates

 Friday 2 February – Nominations open
 Friday 9 February – Nominations close
 Monday 12 February – Full list of nominations announced
 Saturday 3 March – Co-leader candidate session held at Green Party policy conference in Napier
 Sunday 25 March – Zoom conference to be held between candidates and delegates.
 Monday 26 March – End of official campaigning, balloting opens
 Saturday 7 April – Balloting closes 
 Sunday 8 April – Ballots counted and winner announced

Candidates

Declared candidates 

The following individuals announced their candidacy:

Declined

The following individuals were speculated as being possible leadership candidates, but ruled out a bid:
Golriz Ghahraman
Ghahraman, elected as a List MP in 2017 (following special votes being cast) said to media she was "not at all" interested in the position of co-leader.

Jan Logie
A List MP since 2011 and Under-Secretary for Justice since 2017, Jan Logie did not respond to media requests for comment regarding the co-leadership. The press speculated that after Davidson announced her candidacy Logie ruled out running herself.

Deborah Morris-Travers
Former Green Party Chief of Staff Deborah Morris-Travers, who was replaced following Turei's admission to benefit fraud due to her involvement, ruled out a bid for the co-leadership herself.

Denise Roche
Former Green List MP (2011–17) and Auckland City Councillor (2007–10) Denise Roche ruled herself out of standing.

Eugenie Sage
Sage, a List MP since 2011 and since 2017 Minister of Conservation and Minister for Land Information as well as a member of the Green Party's negotiation team with Labour, said she had not yet made any decision; "I'm still getting my feet under the table as a minister." There had been widespread speculation that Sage would put her hand up as a "compromise candidate". Ultimately, she ruled out standing citing a desire to focus on her ministerial duties instead.

Chlöe Swarbrick
Elected as a List MP in 2017, Chlöe Swarbrick declined to stand stating it was "too early" in her career to be co-leader.

Debates
On 1 March a live-streamed debate between Davidson and Genter was held in the Legislative Council Chambers, Wellington hosted by Henry Cooke. Davidson and Genter again met in a debate hosted by Lisa Owen on Newshub Nation on 10 March, and in another hosted by Mihingarangi Forbes on The Hui on 11 March.

Result 
The voting was conducted by delegates from electorates across the country. The following table gives the ballot results:

See also
2017 New Zealand general election
2018 New Zealand National Party leadership election

References

2018 elections in New Zealand
Green Party of Aotearoa New Zealand leadership elections
Indirect elections
March 2018 events in New Zealand
April 2018 events in New Zealand
Green Party of Aotearoa New Zealand female co-leadership election